Michael Thomas Burns (born September 14, 1970) is an American former soccer player. During his playing career, he played for Danish club Viborg FF, three MLS teams, as well as the United States national team.

Burns was most recently the general manager for the New England Revolution of Major League Soccer.

Career

Youth
Burns was born and raised in Marlborough, Massachusetts. At age six, he began playing soccer in local recreation leagues, but never joined a club team. When he reached high school, he played for Marlborough High School boys' team and was named the 1987 Massachusetts High School Player of the Year.

After completing high school, he attended Hartwick College from 1988 to 1991. When he graduated from Hartwick, there were few opportunities for playing soccer professionally in the United States, but Burns continued to play with the U.S. Olympic team as it prepared for the 1992 Summer Olympics. He previously played in the 1987 U16 FIFA World Cup and in the 1989 U-20 FIFA World Cup. The 1989 squad took fourth place in the tournament.

Professional
In 1995, the MLS began an expansion plan to add new teams to the league. In the 1996 MLS Inaugural Allocations, the MLS assigned Burns to the New England Revolution. In August 1995, the MLS loaned out Burns to Danish club Viborg FF. The Revolution retained his rights and Burns returned to play for the Revolution in 1996.  In 1998, Burns earned a place in the MLS All-Star game. In the 1999 off-season, he made several attempts to move back to a European club, trying out with clubs such as Utrecht, Bolton and Hearts.  None of the clubs expressed interest in him and Burns returned to the Revolution. In June 2000, the Revolution traded Burns, Dan Calichman and a first round draft pick to the San Jose Earthquakes in exchange for Mauricio Wright. Burns finished the 2000 season with the Earthquakes.  However, he did not remain with the team and he was traded in March 2001 to the Kansas City Wizards in return for conditional picks in the 2002 MLS SuperDraft.  Burns played two seasons with the Wizards, 2001 and 2002.  In 2002, he was chosen to play in the 2002 MLS All-Star Game.  At the end of the 2002 season, Burns announced his retirement from professional soccer.

Post-Professional
On April 10, 2005, Burns was named as the New England Revolution's Director of Soccer.  He held this position until 2008, when he was promoted to Vice President of Player Personnel.  On November 9, 2011, he was promoted to the General Manager position.

Burns was dismissed by New England on May 13, 2019.

National team
Burns competed in a major tournament on every level: in the U-17 World Championship in 1987, the World Youth Championship in 1989, the Pan American Games in 1991, the Olympic Games in 1992, and the FIFA World Cup, where he was a non-playing squad member in 1994 and then played in 1998.

References

External links
 
 Danish Superliga statistics at danskfodbold.com 
 Danish Superliga statistics

1970 births
Living people
American soccer players
People from Marlborough, Massachusetts
Sportspeople from Middlesex County, Massachusetts
Parade High School All-Americans (boys' soccer)
Hartwick Hawks men's soccer players
American expatriate soccer players
Soccer players from Massachusetts
Viborg FF players
New England Revolution players
San Jose Earthquakes players
Sporting Kansas City players
United States men's international soccer players
Olympic soccer players of the United States
Footballers at the 1992 Summer Olympics
1994 FIFA World Cup players
1995 Copa América players
1996 CONCACAF Gold Cup players
1998 CONCACAF Gold Cup players
1998 FIFA World Cup players
Major League Soccer players
Major League Soccer All-Stars
United States men's youth international soccer players
United States men's under-20 international soccer players
United States men's under-23 international soccer players
Association football defenders
Pan American Games gold medalists for the United States
Pan American Games medalists in football
Footballers at the 1991 Pan American Games
Medalists at the 1991 Pan American Games